Alexander Elessar Yates (born June 1, 1982, in Port au Prince, Haiti) is an American short story writer, and novelist.

Life 
The son of an American diplomat, Yates grew up in the Caribbean and South America, graduating high school in the Philippines. He earned a BA from the University of Virginia in 2004 and an MFA from Syracuse University in 2009. After graduating, Yates took a job at the American Embassy in the Philippines, and has since served with the US Agency for International Development in Rwanda and Afghanistan. He has published one novel for adults, and two for young adults.

His fiction and essays have also appeared in Salon, The Guardian, Recommended Reading, and the Kenyon Review.

He lives in Hanoi, Vietnam.

Awards 
Prior to graduating from the MFA program at Syracuse University, Yates won the Joyce Carol Oates award in both fiction and poetry. His first novel, Moondogs, was listed among the best debuts of 2011 by Kirkus Reviews. His second novel, The Winter Place, was a selection of the Junior Library Guild and the Kansas State Reading Circle.

Works

Novels 

 How We Became Wicked (Atheneum Books for Young Readers, 2019)
 The Winter Place (Atheneum Books for Young Readers, 2015)
 Moondogs (Doubleday, 2011)

Short fiction 

 “Valentine”, Recommended Reading
 “Millionaire”, The Kenyon Review
 “I Know them For Their Wounds”, Salon

Anthologies 

 Lincoln Michael and Nadxeli Nieto, eds. (2015). "Gypsee". Gigantic Worlds. Gigantic Books. .

References 

1982 births
Living people
People from Port-au-Prince
University of Virginia alumni
Syracuse University alumni
21st-century American short story writers
21st-century American novelists
21st-century American essayists
American male novelists
American male short story writers
American male essayists
United States Agency for International Development
21st-century American male writers